Dr. Hani Shennib  ( Hani Shennib) is a direct descendant of the House of Shennib, the eldest son of Ahmed Fouad Shennib. Shennib left Libya in 1969 and was active in the Libyan Opposition in Cairo, where he studied medicine during the 1970s. He was sentenced  in absentia and left for London and then Montreal, amidst the encroachment of Gaddafi's hit squads into the United Kingdom.

Dr Hani Shennib studied at McGill University and the University of Toronto and was appointed to the medical staff of McGill University Health Center, later becoming full professor at McGill University and internationally known in the fields of innovative cardiovascular and thoracic technology and surgery. He was a pioneer in new lung transplantation techniques, robotic heart surgery and minimally invasive lung surgery. He also led the evolution of cardiovascular surgeons into endovascular therapy.

Shennib has published over 200 original articles, books and chapters and holds at least 17 patents. He is currently a full clinical professor at the college of Medicine, University of Arizona, Phoenix, where he has been since 2008.

He is the president of the National Council on US Libya Relations, and is an expert on Libya, particularly its eastern region of Cyrenaica. His interest in Libyan and Arabic politics led him to participate in the activities of the world economic forums and in United Nations Development Programs on education, economic reforms and the status of women in the Arab world. Shennib was elected president of the National Council on Canada Arab Relations and the Board of Governors of Concordia University in Montreal.

Healthcare reform
Shennib is a consultant on global health care issues and has acted as an advisor to the governments of numerous developing nations on new healthcare programs and reforms, including the United Arab Emirates, Kuwait, Kazakhstan and Libya.

Bulgarian nurses crisis
In 2003, Dr. Shennib was asked by the Libyan government to assist in arbitration between the European Union and Libya on the conflict regarding the imprisonment of Bulgarian nurses in relation to the infection of hundreds of Libyan children with HIV.

Family
Shennib has four children: Sarah Besan Shennib, Faisal Shennib, Selma Shennib, and Lara Shennib.

References

Libyan scholars
Libyan surgeons
Libyan expatriates in the United States
Living people
Year of birth missing (living people)
McGill University alumni
University of Arizona faculty